The 1987 Canadian National Challenge Cup was won by Winnipeg Lucania FC.

Results

Team rosters

Winnipeg Lucania FC 
Winnipeg: (Squad): Steve Hooper, Chris Harris, Rob Albo, Rob Watson, Keith Ferbers, Mark Edwards, Doug
Reimer, Venni Sartor, Alex Bustos, John Baillie, Kevin Methot, Dave Dulko, Abe Rempel, Bill Elzard, Kevin
Antonio, Marno Olafson.

New Westminster Q.P.R. 
New Westminster: (Squad): Brad Higgs, Garry Ayre, Carl Shearer, Mike Sephton, Peter Stanley, Jim Roberts,
Jim Easton, Dave Harkison, Lindsay Henderson, Dave Porter, Frank Fiddler, Steve Brown, Kevin Moye, John
Michalec, Stewart Easton, Rick Gomboc.

References

1987
Canadian National Challenge Cup
Nat